The 2007–08 Everton F.C. season was Everton's 16th season in the Premier League, and their 54th consecutive season in the top division of English football.

Season summary
After a sluggish start, Everton climbed the table and stood fourth with ten games left to play. Unfortunately, Everton only won three of these ten games and finished the season in fifth, with 65 points. In many other seasons this would have been good enough to clinch fourth place and Champions League qualification - indeed, Everton finished with more points than they had in 2004–05, when they had finished fourth - but, due to the good form of arch-rivals Liverpool, Everton were forced into fifth, consigning them to UEFA Cup football. Nonetheless, this was a great result for a club with limited financial resources, and served to enhance manager David Moyes' reputation as one of the best managers in England.

Final league table

Squad
Squad at end of season

Left club during season

Player awards 
 Player of the Season - Joleon Lescott
 Players' Player of the Season - Joleon Lescott
 Young Player of the Season - Victor Anichebe
 Reserve / U21 Player of the Season -  John Irving
 Academy Player of the Season - Jack Rodwell
 Goal of the Season - Leon Osman vs. AEL

Transfers

In

Out

Loan in

Loan out

Results

Premier League

UEFA Cup

First round

Group stage

Round of 32

Everton won 8–1 on aggregate.

Round of 16

Fiorentina 2–2 Everton on aggregate. Fiorentina won 4–2 on penalties.

FA Cup

Kick-off delayed by 30 minutes to 3.30pm due to a fire outside the ground.

League Cup

Statistics

Appearances and goals

|-
! colspan=14 style=background:#dcdcdc; text-align:center| Goalkeepers

|-
! colspan=14 style=background:#dcdcdc; text-align:center| Defenders

|-
! colspan=14 style=background:#dcdcdc; text-align:center| Midfielders

|-
! colspan=14 style=background:#dcdcdc; text-align:center| Forwards

|-
! colspan=14 style=background:#dcdcdc; text-align:center| Players transferred out during the season

Disciplinary record
 Disciplinary records for 2007–08 league matches. Players with 1 card or more included only.

References

Everton F.C. seasons
Ever